Steven Bayliss (born 5 May 1959) is a British wrestler. He competed in the men's freestyle 68 kg at the 1984 Summer Olympics.

References

1959 births
Living people
British male sport wrestlers
Olympic wrestlers of Great Britain
Wrestlers at the 1984 Summer Olympics
Sportspeople from London